Lena Hasselström (born 6 February 1972) is a Swedish ski-orienteering competitor, world champion and winner of the overall world cup.

She won two individual gold medals at the 2002 World Ski Orienteering Championships in Borovetz, in the long course and in sprint. She won the overall World Cup in Ski Orienteering in 2000 and in 2001, and finished second in 1995 and 1999.

References

1972 births
Living people
Swedish orienteers
Female orienteers
Ski-orienteers
Foot orienteers
20th-century Swedish women
21st-century Swedish women
Junior World Orienteering Championships medalists